2009 French Polynesian presidential election may refer to:

 February 2009 French Polynesian presidential election
 November 2009 French Polynesian presidential election